Linda Ramone (born July 24, 1960) is an American philanthropist and widow of Johnny Ramone. She is the co-owner and a president of Ramones Productions and was the subject of numerous songs by the Ramones, including "Danny Says", and "She's a Sensation". She is the founder and president of the Johnny Ramone Army, an organization acting on behalf of Johnny Ramone's estate which holds live events and charity fundraisers, preserving his legacy.

Relationship with the Ramones 
Linda originally dated Joey Ramone but later dated and married Johnny Ramone. Stories conflict whether Joey and Linda had broken up prior to Linda dating Johnny or if Linda left Joey for Johnny. Her relationship with Joey and Johnny was referred to as one of the Top 10 Love Triangles by Time magazine and one of the 10 Most Infamous Love Triangles in Music History by Complex magazine. Joey and Johnny continued to tour as the Ramones, even after Linda married Johnny.

Linda is the subject of numerous songs by the Ramones including "She's a Sensation", "Danny Says" and "Merry Christmas (I Don't Want To Fight Tonight)". Just before Johnny's death in 2004, he and Linda supervised the erection of an eight foot tall bronze memorial of Johnny at the Hollywood Forever Cemetery in Los Angeles, California. Linda and Johnny were together for 20 years prior to his death.

In 2012, Linda released the book Commando, an autobiography written by Johnny Ramone. Linda did numerous television interviews to promote the release of the book.

Philanthropy 
Linda is the founder and president of the Johnny Ramone Army, an organization dedicated to preserving the legacy of Johnny Ramone. She also founded the Johnny and Linda Ramone Foundation. She organizes an annual event entitled the Johnny Ramone Tribute at Hollywood Forever to benefit the Johnny Ramone cancer research fund at USC Westside cancer research center led by Dr. David Agus. The events have been attended by celebrities such as Lisa Marie Presley, Priscilla Presley, John Frusciante, Red Hot Chili Peppers, Chris Cornell, Eddie Vedder, Rob Zombie, Kirk Hammett, Steve Jones, and Traci Lords. Additional celebrities who have taken part in the events include John Waters, Rose McGowan, Henry Rollins, Joe Dallesandro and Johnny Depp.

Personal life 
In 2017, Linda was named to Harper's Bazaar'''s list of the 150 Most Fashionable Women Now.
In March 2017, she was credited as an inspiration to Gucci's new line, designed by creative director Alessandro Michele, featuring a "Hollywood Forever" Jacket.

She also appeared as herself in the season seven finale of Portlandia.

In a 2012 interview with Harper's Bazaar'', she showed off the Los Angeles home that she had shared with Johnny Ramone. She now shares the home with her partner, J. D. King. She also revealed that she collects fashion, music and movie memorabilia and maintains a museum-like house with an Elvis room, Barbie room, horror room, Disney room and rock and roll room.

References 

1960 births
Living people
American women philanthropists
People from Rosedale, Queens